Nordstern is the German word meaning "North Star", referring to Polaris. 

It may also refer to:

Places 
 Nordstern (city), planned German metropolis in Nazi-occupied Norway during World War II.
 Nordstern (club), nightclub in Basel, Switzerland.
 Nordsternpark, park in Gelsenkirchen, Germany.
 Villa Nordstern, villa in Lehrte, near Hannover, Germany.

Companies 
 Der Nordstern, former German-language newspaper (1874-1931) published in Minnesota, United States.
 Nordstern AG, former company now part of Frosta AG frozen foods in Bremerhaven, Germany.
 Nordstern (company), former German insurance company now part of AXA group.

Sport 
 Nord Stern PCA, a region of the Porsche Club of America located in Minnesota and Wisconsin, United States.
 BFC Nordstern, former German association football club from Berlin, Germany.
 FC Nordstern Basel, football club from Basel, Switzerland.
 FC Nordstern 1896 München, former German association football club from Munich, Bavaria.

Transport 
 Nordstern, name of the third Blohm & Voss Ha 139 all-metal inverted gull wing floatplane.
 KNFB Nordstern, name of an Austrian steam locomotive.
 Zeppelin LZ 121 Nordstern, a passenger airship in 1920's Germany.

Other uses 
 Nordstern (typeface)

See also 

 
 
 Nord (disambiguation)
 Stern (disambiguation)
 Nordstar (disambiguation)
 Northstar (disambiguation)
 North Star (disambiguation)
 Northern Star (disambiguation)
 Star of the North (disambiguation)
 Étoile du Nord (disambiguation)
 Estrela do Norte (disambiguation)
 Estrella del norte (disambiguation)